Eorpa may refer to:
Eòrpa, a BBC2 Scotland news program
Eorpa (genus), an extinct scorpionfly genus